Kingsmead is a cricket ground in Durban, KwaZulu-Natal, South Africa. Its stated capacity is 25,000, although grass terracing makes up part of the viewing area. The 'end names' are the Umgeni End (north) and the Old Fort Road End (south). It is the home ground of the KwaZulu-Natal Dolphins and Durban's Super Giants.

In October 2019, Hollywoodbets was announced as the naming rights sponsor to the ground, with it now being known as Hollywoodbets Kingsmead Stadium until August 2024.

Cricket
The venue hosted the first home Test for the South African cricket team after re-admission into international cricket and also hosted the Test against the English cricket team in 1939, which lasted from the third to the thirteenth of March and was called off over fears that the English would miss their ship home.

The first Test match to be played here was between South Africa and England on 18 January 1923, which resulted in a draw on the 5th day

It has been renowned as a seamers wicket, and there is also a famous myth regarding how the tide affects batting conditions, as the ground is quite close to the beach. Many batting collapses in matches in the past have jokingly been blamed on changes in the tide.

On 19 September 2007 the ground witnessed Yuvraj Singh's iconic six consecutive sixes off Stuart Broad's over in the World Twenty20 match between India and England, to mark the fastest fifty ever in any form of cricket.

See also
List of Test cricket grounds
List of international cricket centuries at Kingsmead
List of international cricket five-wicket hauls at Kingsmead

References

Kingsmead
2003 Cricket World Cup stadiums
Sports venues in Durban
Test cricket grounds in South Africa